Celestine Ukwu (1940 – 7 May 1977) was a Nigerian Igbo highlife musician during the 1960s and 1970s, best known for his hit songs "Ije Enu", "Igede" and "Money Palava". Described as a "prolific and outstanding composer" by music critic Benson Idonije of Radio Nigeria Two, Ukwu's works have been featured on various world music compilations including The Rough Guide to Highlife and The Rough Guide to Psychedelic Africa.

Life
Ukwu was born in Enugu to music-oriented parents. His father was a local performer of the igede, ikpa and ode genres of Igbo music while his mother was lead singer in a women's musical group. At a young age, he began learning how to read music and play the harmonium with the help of his uncle. Upon completing his primary school education, he went to teacher training school for two years but dropped out to pursue music as a career. He went on to join Mike Ejeagha's group Paradise Rhythm Orchestra in 1962 at Enugu as a vocalist and maraca player before he left to join Mr. Picolo's band who were touring the Democratic Republic of the Congo at the time. He returned to Nigeria to form his own band known as Celestine Ukwu & His Music Royals of Nigeria in 1966 which was later disbanded in 1967 following the outbreak of the Nigerian Civil War, before releasing a song at the outbreak of the war titled 'Hail Biafra'. After the war, Ukwu formed another group, Celestine Ukwu & His Philosophers National; with whom he released several albums, including Igede Fantasia which did well commercially.

Artistry
His songs were primarily composed in Igbo language with a bit of Efik. In a 1986 edition of Thisweek, a writer once wrote that his songs "gave a food for thought to its listeners".

Death
He died in an auto-crash on 7 May 1977.

Discography

Albums

Singles

Compilations
His Philosophies: Compilation (1975)

See also
 List of Igbo people
 List of Nigerian musicians
 Rex Lawson

Bibliography

References

1940 births
1976 deaths
Igbo highlife musicians
Musicians from Enugu
Igbo musicians
Road incident deaths in Nigeria